Mohammed Ahmed Ibrahim (born 1962) is an Emirati artist from Khor Fakkan and one of the pioneer "five" conceptual artists from the United Arab Emirates including Hassan Sharif, Abdullah Al Saadi, Hussain Sharif and Mohammed Kazem.

Exhibitions 
 2019-2020 Desert X AlUla (group exhibition)
 2015 The Unbearable Lightness of Being, YAY Gallery, Baku
 2015 Solo exhibition "Turab", Cuadro Gallery, Dubai
 2013/2014 Solo exhibition "Primordial", Cuadro Gallery, Dubai
 2009 Venice Biennale, Italy
 2005 the Kunst Museum, Bonn, Germany
 2002 Ludwig Forum, Germany 
 2000 the Havana Biennial, Cuba
 1998 the Cairo Biennial, Egypt
 1998 the Institut du Monde Arabe, Paris, France (Collective exhibition)
 1996 the Sharjah Art Museum, Sharjah, United Arab Emirates
 1995 Sittard Art Center, Netherlands 
 1993 Dhaka Biennial, Dhaka, Bangladesh
 (1993 - 2007) Sharjah Biennial, Sharjah, United Arab Emirates
 1990 Emirates Fine Art Society exhibition in Moscow

Awards 
 1999 First Prize for Sculpture, Sharjah Biennial, United Arab Emirates.
 2001 First Prize for Sculpture, Sharjah Biennial, United Arab Emirates.

See also 

List of Emirati visual Artist

References 

Emirati conceptual artists
Emirati contemporary artists
Emirati male artists
People from Khor Fakkan
1962 births
Living people